Albert Henry Tomkin (23 December 1915 – 3 September 1989) was an English professional footballer who played for Formby, Tottenham Hotspur and Northfleet United, and wartime matches for Southport, Cardiff City, Swansea City and Luton Town.

Football career 
Tomkin began his career at non-League club Formby. He signed for Tottenham Hotspur in 1937 but moved to the club's "nursery" team Northfleet United  before making a first team appearance.

The outside left signed professional forms for Tottenham in December 1937 and was a regular in the 'A' team, graduating to the reserves the following season. He made his breakthrough later the same term with a debut for the first team on 4 February 1939 in a 2–1 home win against Norwich City. It was the first of two league matches he played for Spurs.

When the Second World War broke out in September 1939, the Football League was suspended. Tomkin played one further game for Tottenham before returning to his home town of Southport and enlisting for military service. Whilst there in 1940 he played nine games for Southport. With the Wartime League established, Tomkin enrolled as a guest player for competitors Cardiff City and Swansea Town, as well as Luton Town.

He died in Leyland, Lancashire on 3 September 1989.

References 

1915 births
1989 deaths
Footballers from Barrow-in-Furness
Association football outside forwards
English footballers
Formby F.C. players
Tottenham Hotspur F.C. players
Northfleet United F.C. players
Southport F.C. players
English Football League players
Cardiff City F.C. wartime guest players
Swansea Town A.F.C. wartime guest players
Luton Town F.C. wartime guest players
Footballers from Cumbria